Timothy Allen (born 1971) is an English photographer and filmmaker.

Timothy Allen may also refer to:

Timothy F. H. Allen (born 1942), British botanist
Timothy Field Allen, American physician and botanist
Tim Allen (born 1953), American actor
Tim Allen (footballer) (born 1970), former Australian rules footballer
Timmy Allen (born 2000), American basketball player

See also
Tim Allan, PR consultant
Tim Allan (Canadian football) (born 1955), Canadian football player